Rosalee Mason (born 24 April 1979, in London) is a basketball player for England women's national basketball team. She was capped for England over 65 times, has played all over the world and is now a coach. In the 2012 Olympic Games, Mason was one of those selected to carry the Olympic Torch.

Sporting career 
A veteran of several England campaigns, Mason is one of the original players from the inaugural Great Britain Division B season of 2006. She averaged 10.1 ppg in the Division A campaign of 2009 and made her first major tournament appearance in the 2011 EuroBasket Finals in Poland. She also played for GB at the 2005 World University Games in Turkey and on England’s bronze medal-winning team at the 2006 Commonwealth Games in Melbourne, Australia.

References

1979 births
Living people
British women's basketball players
English women's basketball players
Basketball players from Greater London
Commonwealth Games medallists in basketball
Commonwealth Games bronze medallists for England
Basketball players at the 2006 Commonwealth Games
Medallists at the 2006 Commonwealth Games